Sármellék is a village in Zala County, Hungary, notable for the Hévíz-Balaton Airport located nearby.
Its passenger railway closed in 1976, so the only way to-and-from the village is via automobile.

Gallery

References

External links
 Official website 

Populated places in Zala County